István Barta (13 August 1895 – 16 February 1948) was a Hungarian water polo player who competed in the 1924 Summer Olympics,  in the 1928 Summer Olympics, and in the 1932 Summer Olympics.

Barta, who was Jewish, was born in Álmosd.  He first competed at the Olympics in 1924. As a member of the Hungarian water polo team he finished seventh. He played all four matches as goalkeeper. On club level he played for Újpesti TE

He was part of the Hungarian water polo team which won the silver medal in 1928 and the gold medal 1936. In Amsterdam at the 1928 Summer Olympics he played all four matches as goalkeeper. Four years later in Los Angeles he played one match as goalkeeper. He died in Budapest.

Istvan had a daughter Julia who emigrated to Canada and became a pediatrician in Montreal. Istvan had a brother Miklos Barta who was murdered by the Nazis, Istvan had 2 nephews and a niece through his brother Miklos. The Oldest Giz Folden née Barta born in Budapest in 1926 lives in Australia . Giz was Married to Imre Folden who died in 1984, together they had 2 sons Tom Folden and Peter, Both played water polo in Australia at a very competitive level. Tom Folden Has 2 sons Shanon and Gavin, intern Shanon has 3 sons and Gavin a son and daughter.

Miklos had a son Robert Barta who was married to Marta Pinter (a representative of the Hungarian National Swimming Team) had 4 children. The two eldest, Rayner and Yvette both plated water polo in Australia. Rayner, like his great uncle was also a goalkeeper and represented Australia at the 11th Maccabiah games in Israel.

Miklos also had son Osi who died in vienna in 1967 he had 2 children.

See also
 Hungary men's Olympic water polo team records and statistics
 List of Olympic champions in men's water polo
 List of Olympic medalists in water polo (men)
 List of men's Olympic water polo tournament goalkeepers
 List of select Jewish water polo players

References

 profile

External links
 

1895 births
1948 deaths
Hungarian male water polo players
Water polo goalkeepers
Olympic gold medalists for Hungary in water polo
Olympic silver medalists for Hungary in water polo
Water polo players at the 1924 Summer Olympics
Water polo players at the 1928 Summer Olympics
Water polo players at the 1932 Summer Olympics
Medalists at the 1932 Summer Olympics
Medalists at the 1928 Summer Olympics
Sportspeople from Hajdú-Bihar County